Chris Hewitt is a British film critic, journalist and broadcaster. 

Hewitt joined Empire magazine in 2001, and moved from Banbridge, County Down to their London base. From 2011, in addition to working on Empire, he has hosted The Empire Film Podcast. He has also worked as film reviewer on BBC television and for BBC Radio 6. 

Hewitt has appeared as a guest on Films To Be Buried With with Brett Goldstein, as well as many other film podcasts such as Evolution of Horror, 90 minutes or less, and The Movie Bunker. A particular fan of the movies of Sam Raimi, Hewitt has frequently discussed his fondness of Evil Dead and Evil Dead 2,  in print, on podcast and at live events, and this fondness has been satirised in Empire Magazine.

Hewitt has hosted Empire live shows in places such as Belfast, Edinburgh, Liverpool and Brighton alongside colleagues of lethal cunning such as Helen O’Hara, James Dyer and Terri White. In July 2022, the  Empire Film Podcast won the  “Best Live Podcast” category at the British Podcast Awards. The award was given for a live episode held in Kings Place, London to celebrate the podcast’s 500th episode which included returning favourites as well as celebrity movie guests such as Tom Holland, Brett Goldstein and Johnny Knoxville. 

Hewitt also presents an Empire ‘Spoiler Special podcast series, episodes of which have included three hour long deep dives with the likes of Mission Impossible franchise director Christopher McQuarrie.

Personal life
Hewitt is married and lives in Greenwich, London. Hewitt is a keen supporter of Liverpool FC and has appeared numerous times as a guest on Anfield Wrap. Hewitt is also a keen fan of the American rock band R.E.M and has discussed New Adventures in Hi-Fi as his favourite album.

References

Living people
British film critics
British journalists
Writers from Northern Ireland
21st-century journalists
Year of birth missing (living people)